Ivanovskaya is a rural locality (a village) in Vozhbalskoye Rural Settlement, Totemsky District, Vologda Oblast, Russia. The population was 18 as of 2002.

Geography 
Ivanovskaya is located 37 km west of Totma (the district's administrative centre) by road. Yartsevo is the nearest rural locality.

References 

Rural localities in Totemsky District